Bedtime for Isocracy is the only studio E.P. by the American punk rock band Isocracy. It was released on 7-inch vinyl in January 1988 through Lookout! Records with the catalog number LK 005. The title is a parody of the Dead Kennedys' final studio album Bedtime for Democracy (1986), a popular album among punk rock fans at the time. The cover art depicted the members of Isocracy in a bed, accompanied by Jello Biafra.

The track list on the sleeve (along with most online discographies of Isocracy) states that a cover of the Lynyrd Skynyrd song "Freebird" in its full form is the eleventh track. However, no such track is present on the extended play. What makes such a track even more unlikely is the limited recording time 7-inch provides, which in most cases is no more than ten minutes. With the recording time of the other tracks, there would barely be enough room for another twelve-second song, much less a seven-minute one.

Track listing

Personnel
 Jason Beebout - lead vocals
 Lenny Johnson - guitar, backing vocals
 Martin Brome - bass, backing vocals
 Al Sobrante - drums

Production
 Kevin Army - producer, engineer, mixing, recording

Trivia
 The final track on the album, Sgalf Etaredefnoc, is a track that seems to be reversed. When the track is reversed again, it reveals that it is a segment of another Isocracy song, called Confederate Flags. Additionally, the name of the song is Confederate Flags spelled backwards.

References

External links
 Bedtime for Isocracy at Discogs.com

1988 debut EPs
Lookout! Records EPs